KLVQ (1410 AM) is a terrestrial American radio station, relayed by an FM translator, broadcasting an adult contemporary music format. Licensed to Athens, Texas, United States, the station serves Henderson County. The station is owned and operated by High Plains Radio Network, through licensee HPRN Radio Network, LLC..

On December 30, 2016, Lake Country Radio filed to sell KLVQ, KCKL, and translator K233BE to Monte Spearman and Gentry Todd Spearman's High Plains Radio Network for $250,000. The transfer of license was granted and consummation of the sale concluded on June 9, 2017.

Translator

References

External links

LVQ